Stepan Gorbachev (born 2 October 1983) is a Kazakhstani gymnast. He competed at the 2012 Summer Olympics.

References

External links
 

1983 births
Living people
Kazakhstani male artistic gymnasts
Olympic gymnasts of Kazakhstan
Gymnasts at the 2012 Summer Olympics
Sportspeople from Almaty
Gymnasts at the 2002 Asian Games
Gymnasts at the 2006 Asian Games
Gymnasts at the 2010 Asian Games
Gymnasts at the 2014 Asian Games
Asian Games competitors for Kazakhstan
21st-century Kazakhstani people